This is a timeline documenting events of heavy metal in the year 2015.

Bands formed
Abbath 
Artificial Language
Audiotopsy
Baest
Batushka
Beast in Black
 Saint Asonia
 Wild Fire

Bands disbanded
 3 Inches of Blood
 Before the Mourning
 Conducting from the Grave
 Divine Heresy (hiatus)
 In Solitude
 Leander Rising
 Mötley Crüe
 Motörhead
 myGRAIN
 Rise to Remain
 The Safety Fire
 Sister Sin

Bands reformed
 Acid Reign
 Atrophy
 Disturbed (hiatus from 2011 to 2015)
 Ex Deo (hiatus from 2014 to 2015)
 Pist.On
 See You Next Tuesday
 Underoath

Events

 On March 20, 2014, Rush announced that in 2015 they would embark on a 41st anniversary tour to commemorate the release of their first album. The members of Rush have stated that this may be their last full-scale tour.
 On August 2, 2014, Savatage announced that they will reunite for 2015 Wacken Open Air.
 On January 27, L7 announced that they would perform reunion concerts at several summer festivals in 2015, including Download Festival, Hellfest, Azkena Rock Festival and Nova Rock Festival.
 On March 29, Megadeth announced that Chris Adler of Lamb of God would play drums on the band's 15th studio album.
 On March 31, Skeletonwitch announced that former Cannabis Corpse vocalist Andy Horn would be replacing Chance Garnette for their European tour. As of the announcement, Garnette was no longer listed as Skeletonwitch's vocalist.
 On April 2, Megadeth announced that Kiko Loureiro of Angra had joined the band permanently.
 On April 6, Johnny Solinger left Skid Row to pursue a solo career. He was replaced by former TNT singer Tony Harnell.
 On April 7, nearly four weeks after the death of drummer A.J. Pero, Twisted Sister announced that they would embark on their final tour together in 2016, dubbed "Forty and Fuck It", and then split up. Mike Portnoy (Adrenaline Mob of The Winery Dogs and formerly of Dream Theater) will be filling in for Pero on the tour.
 On April 12, Accept announced that ex-Grave Digge guitarist Uwe Lulis, and drummer Christopher Williams had joined the band.
 On April 17, Whitesnake announced Michele Luppi of Secret Sphere as their new keyboardist.
 On April 30, Metal Church announced their reunion with Mike Howe, who was the band's lead singer from 1988 to 1994.
 On May 5, Acid Reign announced that they were reforming after breaking up in 1991.
 On May 30, Athera announced that he had left Susperia for personal reasons.
 On June 15, Morbid Angel announced that they had parted ways with their drummer Tim Yeung and lead vocalist and bassist David Vincent, and reunited with Steve Tucker, who was Vincent's replacement from 1996–2001 and 2003–2004. Later that day, however, Vincent denied that he had left the band. A few days later, Vincent and guitarist Destructhor announced their departures from Morbid Angel.
 On June 23, Disturbed announced their reunion after going on hiatus in October 2011.
 On September 10, drummer Sean Reinert announced that Cynic had split up for the second time, due to "artistic and personal differences." Later that day, however, guitarist and vocalist Paul Masvidal said that the band has not broken up, and will continue "will continue one way or another."
 On September 14, Onslaught announced that they had parted ways with longtime guitarist Andy Rosser Davies, and replaced him with Iain GT Davies.
 On October 30, at least 27 people died and about 180 were injured after a fire broke out during the concert of Romanian band Goodbye to Gravity. The fire resulted in the deaths of the band's drummer, bassist and two guitarists, leaving the singer as the sole survivor.
On October 31, Gamma Ray announced that vocalist Frank Beck had joined the group to share vocal duties with Kai Hansen.
 On November 7, drummer Daniel Svensson announced his departure from In Flames in order to spend more time with his family.
 On November 13, Volbeat announced that they had parted ways with longtime bassist Anders Kjølholm.
 On November 19, The Ghost Inside were involved in a crash when their tour bus collided head on with a tractor trailer. Both drivers died in the collision while the remaining 10 passengers survived. Jonathan Vigil, Zach Johnson, Andrew Tkaczyk and two others were hospitalized in critical condition.
 On December 29, it was announced that Tony Harnell had parted ways with Skid Row.

Deaths
 January 1 – Tommi Kuri, co-founding member of Amberian Dawn and bassist on the first three albums, died from the health issues that had forced him to leave the band in 2011.
 January 3 – Rudy "White Shark" Vercruysse, guitarist of Ostrogoth, died from liver cancer at the age of 59.
 March 1 – Ryan Stanek, co-founding member and former drummer of Broken Hope, died from undisclosed reasons at the age of 42.
 March 20 – A. J. Pero, drummer of Twisted Sister and Adrenaline Mob, died from a heart attack at the age of 55 in the bus while on tour with Adrenaline Mob.
 March 24 – Scott Clendenin, former Death bassist, died at the age of 47, after suffering from health complications.
 April 30 – Shawn Chavez, former guitarist of Havok, died from undisclosed reasons at the age of 30.
 May 5 – Craig Gruber, bassist of Elf and Rainbow, died from prostate cancer at the age of 63.
 May 15 – Terry Jones, vocalist of Pagan Altar, died from cancer at the age of 69.
 May 18 – Ryan Shutler, drummer of Lazarus A.D., died from a heart attack at the age of 28.
 June 4 – Allan Fryer, vocalist of Heaven, died from cancer.
 June 7 – Christopher Lee, actor and singer, died from complications of respiratory disease and heart failure at the age of 93.
 July 21 – Justin Lowe, guitarist of After the Burial, died after falling off a bridge in Minnesota at the age of 32.
 September 14 – Martin "Kiddie" Kearns, drummer of Bolt Thrower, died unexpectedly at the age of 38.
 October 18 – Frank Watkins, bassist of Gorgoroth and former bassist of Obituary, died from cancer at the age of 47.
 October 30 – Mihai Alexandru and Vlad Țelea, guitarists of Goodbye to Gravity, died in a fire which occurred at the Club Colectiv venue.
 November 8 – Bogdan Enache, drummer of Goodbye to Gravity, died after suffering a cardiac arrest from injuries sustained in the Club Colectiv fire.
 November 11 – Alex Pascu, bassist of Goodbye to Gravity, died from injuries sustained in the Club Colectiv fire.
 November 11 – Phil Taylor (a.k.a. Philthy Animal), former drummer of Motörhead, died at the age of 61.
 December 5 – John Garner, vocalist and drummer of Sir Lord Baltimore, died from liver failure at the age of 63.
 December 15 – Terry Horbury, bassist of Vardis, died from cancer at the age of 65.
 December 28 – Ian Kilmister (a.k.a. Lemmy), vocalist and bassist of Motörhead, died from cancer at the age of 70.

Albums released

January

February

March

April

May

June

July

August

September

October

November

December

References

2010s in heavy metal music
Metal